Ángel Ildefonso Rodríguez Nebreda (born 2 January 1972) is a Spanish retired footballer who played as a midfielder, and a current manager.

Playing career
Born in León, Castile and León, Rodríguez played Segunda División B well into his 20s, representing CD Alcoyano, CD Mensajero and Córdoba CF. In 1995, he moved to UD Las Palmas, helping in their promotion to Segunda División in his first season.

Rodríguez moved to fellow second division side CD Numancia in January 1998, being a regular starter during the 1998–99 campaign as the club achieved a first-ever promotion to La Liga. He moved to Sevilla FC in the top tier in the 1999 summer, and made his debut in the category on 29 August, coming on as a second-half substitute for Francisco in a 1–2 away loss against RC Celta de Vigo.

Rodríguez left Sevilla after the club's relegation, and subsequently signed for CA Osasuna still in the first division. He featured sparingly during his one-season spell, and then agreed to a deal with second division side Polideportivo Ejido in 2001.

On 26 July 2004, after three years as a starter at Poli, Rodríguez joined Recreativo de Huelva also in the division two. He left in the following year to return to Alcoyano, but moved to Tercera División side CD Roquetas in January 2006.

Rodríguez returned to the third division in 2007, with UD Villa de Santa Brígida. In 2009, after the club's relegation, he retired at the age of 36.

Managerial career
Managed by Paco Herrera at Numancia, Rodríguez became his assistant at Villarreal CF B. He continued to work as Herrera's second at Celta, Real Zaragoza, Las Palmas and Real Valladolid.

On 17 June 2020, Rodríguez was named manager of UP Langreo in the third division. He left the club on 10 June of the following year, after refusing a contract renewal, and took over Pontevedra CF in the new Segunda División RFEF on 11 July 2021.

On 21 June 2022, after achieving promotion to Primera Federación with Pontevedra, Rodríguez was appointed in charge of Hércules CF back in the fourth tier. On 5 December, however, he was sacked.

Managerial statistics

References

External links

1972 births
Living people
Sportspeople from León, Spain
Spanish footballers
Footballers from Castile and León
Association football midfielders
La Liga players
Segunda División players
Segunda División B players
Tercera División players
CD Alcoyano footballers
CD Mensajero players
Córdoba CF players
UD Las Palmas players
CD Numancia players
Sevilla FC players
CA Osasuna players
Polideportivo Ejido footballers
CD Roquetas footballers
Spanish football managers
Segunda Federación managers
Segunda División B managers
UP Langreo managers
Pontevedra CF managers
Hércules CF managers